The 1988 Giro di Lombardia was the 82nd edition of the Giro di Lombardia cycle race and was held on 15 October 1988. The race started in Como and finished at the Piazza del Duomo in Milan. The race was won by Charly Mottet of the Système U team.

General classification

References

1988
Giro di Lombardia
Giro di Lombardia